Bhima Bhoi Medical College and Hospital, Balangir is a full-fledged tertiary Government medical college and hospital. It is located at Balangir district, Odisha. The college imparts the degree Bachelor of Medicine and Bachelor of Surgery (MBBS) as well as specialized degrees. The hospital associated with the college is one of the largest in the Balangir district. Selection to the college is done on the basis of merit through the National Eligibility and Entrance Test. Yearly undergraduate student intake is 100.

Courses
Bhima Bhoi Medical College, Odisha undertakes education and training of students in MBBS courses.

Affiliations
The college is affiliated with the Sambalpur University and is recognized by the National Medical Commission.

References

Medical colleges in Odisha
Universities and colleges in Odisha
Educational institutions established in 2018
2018 establishments in Odisha